Mark Edward Landon-Lane (born 6 February 1969) is a New Zealand cricketer. He was born and raised in Blenheim by his parents Stan and Helen Landon-Lane. His father was a successful local cricket player as was his brothers Les and Doug Lane of Wairau Valley.

A wicket-keeper, Lane made seven appearances in youth internationals for New Zealand, scoring 214 runs and claiming 10 dismissals. He went on to make 22 first-class and 6 List A appearances for three sides: Wellington (1990–92), Central Districts (1993–94) and Canterbury (1995–97).

References

External links

1969 births
Living people
New Zealand cricketers
Wellington cricketers
Central Districts cricketers
Canterbury cricketers
Wicket-keepers